Lomonosov may refer to:

 Lomonosov (surname)
 Lomonosov, Russia (formerly Oranienbaum), a town in Russia
 Lomonosov Moscow State University, university in Moscow, Russia
 Lomonosov Bridge in Saint Petersburg, Russia
 Lomonosov diamond mine in Russia
 Lomonosov Gold Medal, annual award given by the Russian Academy of Sciences
 Akademik Lomonosov, Russian non-self-propelled vessel
 Mikhailo Lomonosov (satellite), Russian scientific satellite
 Lomonosov porcelain: renaming of the Imperial Porcelain Factory, Saint Petersburg from 1925 to 2005

Geographical features
 Lomonosovfonna, ice cap on Spitsbergen, Svalbard
 Lomonosov Ridge in the Arctic Ocean 
 Lomonosov Current in the Atlantic Ocean 
 Lomonosov Group, volcanic group in the Kuril Islands
 Lomonosov Mountains in Antarctica

Craters
 Lomonosov (lunar crater), lunar crater located just behind the western limb of the Moon, named after polymath
 Lomonosov (Martian crater), medium crater on Mars, named after polymath

See also

 M. V. Lomonosov School of Electrotechnics and Electronics